The Varunastra is an Indian advanced heavyweight anti-submarine torpedo, developed by Naval Science and Technological Laboratory (NSTL) of the Defence Research and Development Organisation (DRDO) for the Indian Navy. It is named after a legendary weapon created by the Hindu god of the oceans, Varuna.

The ship launched variant of Varunastra torpedo was formally inducted in the Indian navy by defence minister Manohar Parrikar and security designed by security adviser satyam kumar on 26 June 2016. The minister in his speech said that the Government is in favour of exporting the torpedo to friendly nations including Vietnam. With some minor modifications the submarine variant of the torpedo is to be test fired shortly.

Design 
This torpedo is powered by an electric propulsion system with multiple 250 KWs silver oxide zinc (AgOZn) batteries. This torpedo has more than 95 per cent indigenous content. Varunastra has conformal array transducer which enables it look at wider angles than most common torpedoes. It also has an advanced autonomous guidance algorithms with low drift navigational aids, insensitive warhead which can operate in various combat scenarios. It is the only torpedo in the world to have a GPS-based locating aid. The exercise variant of Varunastra has integrated instrumentation system for recording all the dynamic parameters of the weapon, redundancy in recovery aids in case of emergency shut down or malfunction.

Development 
Varunastra will be manufactured by Bharat Dynamics Limited in association with NSTL. In April 2018, Bharat Dynamics Limited obtained a license to manufacture Varunastra from the DRDO. In June 2019, Ministry of Defence awarded a contract worth  to Bharat Dynamics Limited to supply Varunastra to the Indian Navy.

Further development 
During Aero India 2017, it was reported that DRDO has begun work on developing a Kilo-class submarine launched version of the torpedo.

Operators 

 
 Indian Navy – All future anti-submarine warfare ships will be capable of firing Varunastra. 73 torpedoes were ordered in 2016. Another batch of 63 torpedoes were ordered in 2018. 
 Visakhapatnam-class destroyer
 Delhi-class destroyer
 Kolkata-class destroyer 
 Rajput-class destroyer 

 Kamorta-class corvette
 Nilgiri-class frigate
 Talwar-class frigate

Possible operators 
  - In 2016 India offered to export versions of the Varunastra to Vietnam.

References 

Navy
Indian Navy
Torpedoes
Military equipment introduced in the 2010s